MSE may refer to:

Education
 Master of Science in Engineering, a university degree
 Master of Science in Software Engineering, a college degree in software engineering
 Master of Software Engineering, a university degree; for example at the Information and Communications University

Science, technology and engineering
 Manned Spaceflight Engineer, an astronaut in the United States Air Force's Manned Spaceflight Engineer Program
 Mars Surface Exploration
 Materials Science and Engineering
 Maunakea Spectroscopic Explorer, a planned renovation of the Canada–France–Hawaii Telescope
 Maximum spacing estimation, in statistics
 Mean squared error, in statistics
 Mechanically stabilized earth
 Mental status examination, used by clinicians to assess aspects of a patient's mental state
 Mercury Surface Element, the lander portion of BepiColombo space mission
 MSE (centrifuges), Measuring and Scientific Equipment, manufacturer of laboratory centrifuges
 Selenomethionine, a naturally occurring amino acid

Computing
 Message Stream Encryption, a BitTorrent protocol encryption
 Media Source Extensions, a W3C standard for Javascript media streaming
 Metasearch engine, a search engine that consolidates results from other search engines
 Microsoft Security Essentials, a free antivirus software
 Mobile Subscriber Equipment, a tactical communications system formerly used by units such as the 17th Signal Battalion (United States)

Stock exchanges
 Macedonian Stock Exchange
 Madras Stock Exchange
 Madrid Stock Exchange
 Malawi Stock Exchange
 Malta Stock Exchange
 Mongolian Stock Exchange
 Montenegro Stock Exchange
 Montreal Stock Exchange

Other
 Kent International Airport, by IATA airport code
 Mississippi Export Railroad, common freight carrier in Mississippi, by reporting mark
 Martha Stewart Everyday, a mass-market brand of Martha Stewart Living Omnimedia sold through Kmart
 Medical Science Educator, academic journal
 Melbourne String Ensemble
 Micro and Small Enterprises
 Ministry of Sustainability and the Environment, in Singapore
 MoneySavingExpert.com, a British consumer finance information website
 Monumental Sports & Entertainment, company owned by American businessman Ted Leonsis